Tom Lomsdahl (August 6, 1874 – March 30, 1951) was an American businessman and elected official.

Tom Lomsdahl was born in Søndre Land in  Oppland, Norway. At the age of 18, Lomsdahl emigrated to the United States with his widowed mother,  Maren Andresdtr Lomsdahl. His mother subsequently married Erick C Hagen, a widower from Søndre Land. The family settled in Trempealeau County, Wisconsin. Tom Lomsdahl  was married to Mary Gunem.
Tom Lomsdahl was the owner-operator of Tom Lonsdahl & Company, a dealer in hardware, farm implements, agricultural machinery and automobiles. Lomsdahl was also involved in the telephone, banking, and grain elevator businesses. Lomsdahl served on the town and village boards of Osseo, Wisconsin and was president of the city council. Lomsdahl was elected from the Wisconsin Progressive Party to serve in the Wisconsin State Assembly in 1935 and 1937.

Notes

1874 births
1951 deaths
People from Søndre Land
People from Osseo, Wisconsin
Norwegian emigrants to the United States
Businesspeople from Wisconsin
American Lutherans
Wisconsin city council members
Mayors of places in Wisconsin
Wisconsin Progressives (1924)
20th-century American politicians
Members of the Wisconsin State Assembly